Infurcitinea vanderwolfi is a moth of the family Tineidae. It is found in Bulgaria, Greece and Croatia.

References

Moths described in 1997
Meessiinae